Floren Chapel or Flora Chapel ( or ) is a parish church of the Church of Norway in Stjørdal municipality in Trøndelag county, Norway. It is located in the village of Flornes. It is one of the churches for the Hegra parish which is part of the Stjørdal prosti (deanery) in the Diocese of Nidaros. The white, wooden church was built in a long church style in 1902 using plans drawn up by the architect Gunnar Øverkil. The church seats about 170 people.

See also
List of churches in Nidaros

References

Stjørdal
Churches in Trøndelag
Long churches in Norway
Wooden churches in Norway
20th-century Church of Norway church buildings
Churches completed in 1902
1902 establishments in Norway